Eduard Duller (18 November 1809, Vienna – 24 July 1853, Wiesbaden) was a German-Austrian writer and clergyman, very active as a poet, novelist and later as a historian.

Life 
His biological father died before his birth and so he was brought up lovingly but strictly by his stepfather. A gifted child, he studied philosophy and law in his home town of Vienna as well as writing his first fiction, premiering his first play, titled Meister Pilgram, aged 17. His advanced humanist attitudes made him unsuited to Austrian education under the Metternich System and its Carlsbad Decrees, so in 1830 he left Austria for Munich, where in 1831 he premiered his play Die Wittelsbacher. A year later he mover to Trier, befriending and graduating alongside Friedrich von Sallet. In Trier he withdrew into himself, but gained the clergy's hatred through his play Franz von Sickingen.

In 1834 he moved to Frankfurt am Main and there began publishing the Phönix. Frühlings-Zeitung für Deutschland. (Phoenix - a spring magazine for Germany). This literary journal published fictional works by Georg Büchner, Christian Dietrich Grabbe and other Vormärz writers. Duller handed the editorship over to Karl Gutzkow in summer 1835 and in 1836 moved to Darmstadt, where stayed from then until 1849 and took a lively interest in the German Catholicism movement, which sought to remove papal influence on Catholicism in Germany. His most notable work from the modern perspective is his Die Jesuiten, a populist account of the history and present activities of the Jesuits - on page 109 of it, he wrote:

The work gives presents a negative view of the Order, writing of its alleged hidden criminal activities, showing its moral and social principles as harmful and the Catholic Church as misusing religion. On page 97 he writes:

He later moved again, to Mainz, where in 1851 he became priest to the German Catholic denomination. His grave is in the Mainzer Hauptfriedhof.

Works

Novels and poetry
 Kronen und Ketten (Frankfurt 1835, 3 volumes).
 Loyola (Frankfurt 1836, 3 volumes).
 Kaiser und Papst (Leipzig 1838, 4 volumes).
 Der Fürst der Liebe (Leipzig 1842, 2nd edition 1854).
 Gesammelten Gedichte (Berlin 1845; new edition, Leipzig 1877).

Histories
 Vaterländische Geschichte (Frankfurt 1852–57, 5 volumes; Microfiche-Ausgabe ), extended after Duller's death by Karl Hagen.
 Geschichte des deutschen Volkes (Leipzig 1840, 3. Ausl. 1846; newly edited by William Pierson, Berlin 1861; 6th edition 1877).
 Die Jesuiten, wie sie waren und wie sie sind (Leipzig 1845; 3rd edition, Brandenb.1861).
 a continuation of Schiller's Geschichte des Abfalls der Vereinigten Niederlande (History of the Revolt of the United Netherlands; Köln 1841, 3 volumes).
 Maria Theresia (Wiesbaden 1844, 2 Bände).
 Erzherzog Carl von Österreich (Wien 1847, Illustrations by Moritz von Schwind).
 Die Männer des Volks dargestellt von Freunden des Volks (Frankfurt 1847–50, 8 volumes) etc.

Sources 

 Duller, Eduard, in Constant von Wurzbach, Biographisches Lexikon des Kaiserthums Oesterreich, 3 volumes, Wien 1858.

External links 
 
 Meyer 1888
 

1809 births
1853 deaths
Writers from Vienna
19th-century German poets
19th-century German novelists
19th-century Austrian historians
Austrian male poets
German male poets
19th-century Austrian novelists
German male novelists
19th-century Austrian poets
19th-century German male writers
German male non-fiction writers